The Indonesian island of Sumatra is the sixth largest island in the world. The rich ethnic diversity and historical heritage in Sumatra is reflected in the range of architectural styles in the island. The vernacular style is the native Sumatran ethnic groups architecture of dwellings, while the Hindu-Buddhist architecture reflected through the cultural historical heritage of candis built in Sumatra. The third wave is Islamic architecture adopted in mosques and palace in Sumatra, especially in Aceh, North Sumatra, and Malay cultural sphere in the island.

Vernacular architecture 

The traditional vernacular architecture including:
 Batak architecture
 Rumah uma from Mentawai
 Uma (Gajo house) from the Gayo district near Aceh
 Omo sebua of Nias
 Rumah Gadang of the Minangkabau
 Rumoh Aceh, the traditional vernacular houses of Aceh
 Rumah Melayu, the traditional home of the ethnic Malays from the east coast of Sumatra (Palembang, Jambi, Bengkulu, Riau, Riau archipelago, eastern North Sumatera and Aceh Tamiang Regency) 
 Traditional architecture of Enggano
 Nua, the traditional houses of the Lampung area
 Lontiok House, the traditional house of Kampar Riau

Hindu-Buddhist architecture 

Several Hindu-Buddhist architecture in the form of candis (temples) dated from 7th to 13th century are found scaterred in Sumatra. These temples are mostly linked to Buddhist maritime empire of Srivijaya. Although not as grand and elaborately designed as Hindu-Buddhist temples of Java, the temples of Sumatra mostly built from red brick material have their own style, these temples among other:
Muaro Jambi Temple Compounds, Jambi
Muara Takus temples, Riau
Bahal temple, North Sumatra 
Angsoka temple, Palembang
Bumi Ayu temple, Muara Enim Regency, South Sumatra

Islamic architecture 

Islam reached northern Sumatra first before any other part of the archipelago. The Islamic architecture adopted in Sumatran Sultanates mosques and istanas (palaces). The most notable architecture influences are Persian and Indian Mughal architecture. Examples of Islamic architecture in Sumatra are:
Asserayah Hasyimiyah Palace, Riau
Baiturrahman Grand Mosque, Banda Aceh
Medan Grand Mosque, Medan
Maimun Palace, Medan
Muhammadan Mosque, Padang
Mosque and Palace complex of Penyengat Island, Riau Islands
Palembang Grand Mosque, Palembang

See also

 Batak architecture
 Architecture of Indonesia

Rumah adat
Sumatra